Khan Bahadur – a compound of khan ('leader') and bahadur ('brave') – was a formal title of respect and honor, which was conferred exclusively on Muslim and other non-Hindu natives of British India. It was one degree higher than the title of Khan Sahib. 

The title was conferred on individuals for faithful service or acts of public welfare to the Empire. Recipients were entitled to prefix the title to their name and were presented with a special Title Badge and a citation (or sanad). It was conferred on behalf of the Government of British India by the Viceroy and Governor-General of India.

The title was dis-established in 1947 upon the independence of India.

The title "Khan Bahadur" was originally conferred in Mughal India on Muslim subjects in recognition of public services rendered and was adopted by British India for the same purpose and extended to cover other non-Hindu subjects of India. Hindu subjects of British India were conferred the title of "Rai Bahadur".

Recipients 
The following is a chronological list of selected recipients (the list below is not exhaustive):
 1881: Khan Bahadur Khuda Bakhsh C.I.E, Former Chief Justice of Hyderabad State, Founder of Khuda Bakhsh Oriental Library
 Raja Mir Syed Muhammad Baquar Ali Khan C.I.E. of Morni, Kotaha and Pindrawal
 1887: Nawab Sirjaul Islam

 1891: Mian Ghulam Farid Khan Bahadur, former Extra-Assistant Commissioner in Punjab and Honorary Magistrate of Batala.
 Khan Bahadur Khalifullah Rowther Sahib, Dewan of Pudukkottai State
 1905: Muhammad Habibullah was awarded the title of Khan Bahadur by the Indian government
 1912: Khan Bahadur Sayed Rustom Ali (Registrar, Court of the Political Resident, Aden).
 1912: Khan Bahadur, Nadir Husain, District Superintendent of Police, Bengal.
 1914: Khan Bahadur Muhammad Hira Khan, (Civil Engineer from University of Roorkee (Gold Medalist); Supervisor, Public Works Department, Lucknow, United Provinces.
 1915: Khan Bahadur Syed Abdul Majid, CIE (Bengali politician, lawyer and entrepreneur)
 1923: Khan Bahadur Mian Muhammad Said, Bar-at-law, British-Indian Police and Minister in Royal State of Kapurthala.
 1925: Khan Bahadur Maulvi Gada Husain, (retired) Deputy Collector, United Provinces.
 1925: Khan Bahadur Maulvi Alimuzzaman Chaudhuri. M.L.C. Landholder and Chairman, District Board and Municipality, Faridpur.

 1929: Khan Bahadur Major General Fateh Naseeb Khan, Alwar State, Rajputana
 1930: Khan Bahadur, Syed Niaz Qutb (also spelled as Qutab), Postmaster General.
 1931: Khan Bahadur Maulvi Muhammad Fazlul Karim, Magistrate, collector, and administrator of Refugees, Bengal.
 1935: Sheikh Abdullah (1874–1965), Indian educationalist, social reformer, lawyer, and the founder of Women's College, Aligarh.
 1936: Khan Bahadur Waliur Rahman, Planter and Proprietor of several tea gardens in Duars, Assam.
 1937: Khan Bahadur Muhammad Humayun, District Collector 1937-1939, ICS - Nellore.
 1938: Khan Bahadur Maulvi Muhammad Yahya, (retired) Deputy Magistrate, Deputy Collector and Chief Manager, Dacca Nawab Estate
 1943: Khan Bahadur Yousof Hossain Chaudhury, Vice-President, District School Board, Faridpur.
 Aziz al-Hasan Ghouri

See also
Dewan Bahadur
Rai Bahadur
Rai Sahib
Title Badge (India)

References 

Indian court titles
Titles in Bangladesh
Titles in India
Titles in Pakistan